The 2012–13 North West Counties Football League season was the 31st in the history of the North West Counties Football League, a football competition in England. Teams were divided into two divisions: the Premier Division and Division One.

Premier Division 

The Premier Division featured three new teams:

 Norton United promoted as runners-up of Division One
 Stockport Sports relegated from the NPL Division One North and a name change from Woodley Sports
 Wigan Robin Park promoted as champions of Division One

From this league, only Barnoldswick Town, Bootle, Colne, Congleton Town, Glossop North End, Maine Road, Padiham, Runcorn Linnets, Runcorn Town and Winsford United applied for promotion.

League table

Results

Locations

Division One 

Division One featured two new teams:

 Atherton Laburnum Rovers relegated from the Premier Division
 West Didsbury & Chorlton promoted from the Manchester League

League table

Results

Locations

References

 http://www.nwcfl.com/league-tables.php

External links 
 nwcfl.com (The Official Website of The North West Counties Football League)
 National League System Rules 2012/13
 Standardised League Rules 2012/13

North West Counties Football League seasons
9